The men's 3000 metres steeplechase at the 1954 European Athletics Championships was held in Bern, Switzerland, at Stadion Neufeld on 26 and 28 August 1954.

Medalists

Results

Final
28 August

Heats
26 August

Heat 1

Heat 2

Participation
According to an unofficial count, 21 athletes from 14 countries participated in the event.

 (1)
 (1)
 (2)
 (2)
 (1)
 (1)
 (1)
 (1)
 (2)
 (2)
 (2)
 (1)
 (2)
 (2)

References

3000 metres steeplechase
Steeplechase at the European Athletics Championships